Mun Seung-man (Hangul:  문승만) born 12 May 1989 in South Korea is a South Korean former footballer who was last attached to Geylang International of the Singaporean S.League in 2012, his only professional experience. His strengths include shot power and spacing.

Singapore

Recruited by Geylang International of the Singaporean S.League for the 2012 S.League, Seung-man was almost bribed by footballers Kim Jae-hong and Jeon Byung-guk to not score, who were incarcerated for five to ten months. Later that season, the Korean was used in defense due to underperforming in attack, managing only one goal.

Delivered a goal to help Geylang reach the semi-finals of the 2012 Singapore League Cup.

References

External links 
 at Soccerway

Living people
Association football forwards
1989 births
South Korean footballers
South Korean expatriate footballers
Geylang International FC players
Expatriate footballers in Singapore
South Korean expatriate sportspeople in Singapore